The 2017 FIBA U16 European Championship Division B was played in Sofia, Bulgaria, from 10 to 19 August 2017. 24 teams participated in the competition. Greece won the competition without losing a single game and won the promotion to Division A. Netherlands and Georgia also gained promotion.

Participating teams 

  (14th place, 2016 FIBA U16 European Championship Division A)

  (Winners, 2016 FIBA U16 European Championship Division C)

  (16th place, 2016 FIBA U16 European Championship Division A)

  (15th place, 2016 FIBA U16 European Championship Division A)

First round 
In this round, twenty-four teams are allocated in four groups of six teams each. First two teams advance to the Final round and other teams advance to Classification for 9th–24th place.

Group A

Group B

Group C

Group D

Final round

Bracket 

5th–8th place bracket

Quarterfinals

Semifinals

Bronze medal game

Final

9th–24th place classification

9th–16th place bracket 

13th–16th place bracket

17th–24th place bracket 

21st–24th place bracket

Final standings

Awards

References

External links
FIBA official website

FIBA U16 European Championship Division B
B
2017–18 in European basketball
2017–18 in Bulgarian basketball
International youth basketball competitions hosted by Bulgaria
Sports competitions in Sofia
August 2017 sports events in Europe